Bình Thủy is a district of Cần Thơ in the Mekong Delta region of Vietnam. As of 2003 the district had a population of 87,665. The district covers an area of 69 km².

Administrative divisions
The district is divided into 8 wards (phường):

Trà Nóc: 712 ha, 10,513 people (2007)
Trà An: 565.67 ha, 5,339 people (2007)
An Thới: 384.83 ha, 14,445 people (2007)
Bùi Hữu Nghĩa: 637.12 ha, 11,185 people (2007)
Thới An Đông: 1,167.56 ha, 9,438 people (2004)
Bình Thuỷ
Long Tuyền: 1,413.55 ha, 13,250 people (2004)
Long Hoà: 1,395.08 ha, 13,471 people (2004).

Notable landmarks
Đình Bình Thủy 
 Long Quang Pagoda

References

Districts of Cần Thơ